Jangi Jollof is a 2018 Gambian film inspired by a memoir written by Momodou Sabally, former Secretary General and Minister of Presidential Affairs in The Gambia. It follows Sabally's life story, and the struggles he went through to succeed in life. The film was produced and directed by Bakary Sonko.

Cast 
 Monica Davies
 Omar Cham
 Lamin Saho
 Ebrima Correa
 Mbaye Bittaye
 Bubacarr Touray
 Fatou S. Bojang
 Papis Kebba Jobbareth
 Sheikh Tijan Sonko

Plot 
A young man who works hard  to educate himself through University  as a result of him coming from a poor background, he made a difference in the society and country at large and inspires the young ones who comes after him through his story.

Awards 
At the Special Movie Awards (SMA) 2018, Jangi Jollof won two awards: Monica Davies won Best Female Actor, and Momodou Sabally won Best Story or Screenplay.

References 

Gambian drama films
2018 films